Vevelstad Church is a parish church of the Church of Norway in Vevelstad Municipality in Nordland county, Norway. It is located in the village of Forvika. It is the main church for the Vevelstad parish which is part of the Sør-Helgeland prosti (deanery) in the Diocese of Sør-Hålogaland. The white, wooden church was built in a long church style in 1796 using plans drawn up by an unknown architect. The church seats about 250 people. The church was renovated in 1871, expanding the length of the nave and increasing the ceiling height.

See also
List of churches in Sør-Hålogaland

References

Churches in Nordland
Vevelstad
Wooden churches in Norway
18th-century Church of Norway church buildings
Churches completed in 1796
1796 establishments in Norway
Long churches in Norway